Saint-Félix may refer to:

People 
 Saint: see Saint Felix
 Armand de Saint-Félix, French Navy officer of the 18th century

Places

Canada

 Saint-Félix-de-Dalquier,  Abitibi, Québec
 Saint-Félix-de-Kingsey, a municipality in Centre-du-Québec, Québec
 Saint-Félix-de-Valois, a municipality in Lanaudière, Québec
 Saint-Félix-d'Otis, a municipality in Saguenay, Québec
 St. Felix, Prince Edward Island, Prince County, Prince Edward Island

France

 Saint-Félix, Allier, in the Allier département
 Saint-Félix, Charente, in the Charente département
 Saint-Félix, Charente-Maritime, in the Charente-Maritime département
 Saint-Félix, Lot, in the Lot département
 Saint-Félix, Oise, in the Oise département
 Saint-Félix, Haute-Savoie, in the Haute-Savoie département
 Saint-Félix-de-Bourdeilles, in the Dordogne département
 Saint-Félix-de-Foncaude, in the Gironde département
 Saint-Félix-de-l'Héras, in the Hérault département
 Saint-Félix-de-Lodez, in the Hérault département
 Saint-Félix-de-Lunel, in the Aveyron département
 Saint-Félix-de-Pallières, in the Gard département
 Saint-Félix-de-Reillac-et-Mortemart, in the Dordogne département
 Saint-Félix-de-Rieutord, in the Ariège département
 Saint-Félix-de-Sorgues, in the Aveyron département
 Saint-Félix-de-Tournegat, in the Ariège département
 Saint-Félix-de-Villadeix, in the Dordogne département
 Saint-Félix-Lauragais, in the Haute-Garonne département

Haiti
 Saint-Felix, Torbeck, Haiti

See also 
 São Félix (disambiguation)